The Mecklenburg Class P 4.2, formerly Class VII, were early German steam locomotives operated by the  Grand Duchy of Mecklenburg Friedrich-Franz Railway and were used specifically for hauling express trains on the line from Warnemünde to Berlin. They were mechanically identical with the Prussian P 4.2. All 31 units were taken over by the Deutsche Reichsbahn who incorporated them as Class 36.6 with numbers 36 602–620 and 651–662. The first series of numbers were engines with a 14 t axle load, the second those with a 15 t axle load. In 1931 the last locomotive of this class was retired.

No. 36 601 was a Prussian P 4.2 that was redeployed to Mecklenburg in 1920.

Apart from three units, these engines were equipped with Class 2'2' T 16 tenders.

References 

 
 

4-4-0 locomotives
P04.2
Railway locomotives introduced in 1903
Standard gauge locomotives of Germany
2′B n2v locomotives

Passenger locomotives